Onustus exutus is a species of large sea snail, a marine gastropod mollusk in the family Xenophoridae, the carrier shells.

Description

Distribution
Onustus exustus is distributed in the Central Indo-Pacific from southern Japan to southern Indonesia, tropical Western Australia, northern Australia and Papua. It can be found between 18 and 340 m.

References

External links

Xenophoridae
Gastropods described in 1842